Dinton may refer to:

Dinton, Buckinghamshire
Dinton, Wiltshire

See also

Danton (name)